Caracara is a genus in the family Falconidae and the subfamily Polyborinae. It contains one extant species, the crested caracara; and one extinct species, the Guadalupe caracara.  The South American Classification Committee of the American Ornithological Society has voted to again merge the two, retaining C. plancus as crested caracara. The taxonomists of the International Ornithologists' Union have also merged them.

Appearance 
The crested caracara is distinguished by its long legs and medium size. There are usually four points of identification of the caracara: strikingly white markings on the neck, the tip of both wings, and the tail. When flying, the caracara is often noted to have a pattern on their underside that looks like a cross.

Behavior 
The behaviors of caracaras are considered quite strange in relation to those of other falcons. The bird is often seen walking on the ground in search of prey, using its long legs to maneuver its landscapes. In addition to a preference of walking over flying, the birds also create close bonds with their mates. Caracaras are territorial creatures who are year-round landlords of trees and land that they occupy. Their aggressiveness is an extension of this, which is why they have been seen taking food from much larger creatures like vultures. In flight, this bird is known for having very direct flight. It does not soar for leisure.

Taxonomy and fossil record

The crested caracara is the only extant species in Caracara, and was formerly separated into two species, the northern and southern crested caracaras. The modern range includes Cuba, South America, most of Central America and Mexico, just reaching the southernmost parts of the United States, including Florida.

†Guadalupe caracara (Caracara lutosa) – extinct (1900)
Native to Guadalupe Island off the west coast of Baja California, the Guadalupe caracara was hunted to extinction by 1906.

An additional six species have been described on the basis of fossil and subfossil records:
 †Caracara creightoni – Late Pleistocene (Cuba, The Bahamas)
 †Caracara latebrosus – Late Pleistocene (Puerto Rico) 
 †Caracara major - Late Pleistocene (Uruguay)
 †Caracara prelutosus - Late Pleistocene (Rancho La Brea, San Miguel Island, California)
 †Caracara seymouri - Late Pleistocene (Peru, Ecuador)
 †Caracara tellustris – Late Pleistocene (Jamaica)

References

Further reading
 Dove, C. & R. Banks. 1999. A Taxonomic study of Crested Caracaras (Falconidae). Wilson Bull. 111(3): 330–339.

External links
Photo of crested caracara at Brazos Bend State Park, Texas : 

 
Bird genera
Bird genera with one living species
Polyborinae

pl:Karakary